Cambarincola is a genus of annelids belonging to the family Branchiobdellidae.

The species of this genus are found in Europe and Northern America.

Species:

Cambarincola acudentatus 
Cambarincola alienus 
Cambarincola barbarae

References

Annelids